Anampses geographicus, the geographic wrasse, 
is a fish found in the Indo West Pacific Ocean.

References

Geographic wrasse
Fish described in 1840
Taxa named by Achille Valenciennes